Ardley is an English toponym and may refer to:

Places
 Ardley Cove, South Shetland Islands, Antarctica
 Ardley Island, South Shetland Islands, Antarctica
 Ardley, Alberta, Canada
 Ardley, Oxfordshire, UK
 Ardley Castle
 Ardley railway station
 Ardley End, Essex, UK

Other uses
 Ardley United F.C., British football club

See also
Ardley (surname)